The English architect Frank Matcham was responsible for the design and refurbishment of around 164 buildings, mostly theatres, throughout the United Kingdom. He entered the architectural profession when he was 21, in 1874, and joined the practice of J. T. Robinson, his future father-in-law, a few years later. Matcham completed his first solo design, the Elephant and Castle theatre, in June 1879, having taken over Robinson's practice upon his death.  He founded his own practice, Matcham & Co., in 1883 which experienced much prosperity. His most successful period was between 1892 and 1912, during which there was an increased demand for variety theatres which resulted in the closure and dismantlement of many music halls, which had become outdated.

Although being more prolific in the provinces, Matcham is perhaps best known for his work in London under Moss Empires, for whom he designed the Hippodrome in 1900, Hackney Empire (1901), London Coliseum (1903), Shepherd's Bush Empire (1903), London Palladium (1910), and the Victoria Palace in 1911. He seldom ever strayed from theatrical design but on occasion, renovated public houses and, in 1898, designed a number of buildings for the redevelopment of Briggate in Leeds, including the Cross and County Arcades.

Matcham retired to Southend-on-sea, Essex, shortly before the First World War, and left his business, Matcham & Co., to his business partners, R.A. Briggs and F. G. M. Chancellor. Matcham died in 1920. Many of the 164 buildings that he either designed or rebuilt during his 40-year career, were demolished in the 1960s. There are currently around 52 known structures that survive, as of 2017. According to the dramatist, Alan Bennett, "there was scarcely a town in the United Kingdom that didn't boast one of Matcham's theatres and, though scores have been lost, enough remain to testify to the achievement of someone who was undoubtedly [the U.K's] greatest theatrical architect."

Key

Buildings

Surviving theatres

Note: The source for Matcham's buildings, except as otherwise noted, is David Wilmore, Frank Matcham & Co, pp. 178–183.

Other buildings

Note: The source for Matcham's buildings, except as otherwise noted, is David Wilmore, Frank Matcham & Co, pp. 178–183.

Demolished theatres

Note: The source for Matcham's theatres, except as otherwise noted, is Brian Mercer Walker, Frank Matcham: Theatre Architect, pp. 154–173.

Theatres demolished since Brian Mercer Walker publication (1980) 
1889 – Theatre Royal, St Helens – Although there is a theatre on the site, it bears little resemblance to its original Matcham design as it was reconstructed in 1964. There were two theatres previous to the current building; the first was also by Matcham and was originally opened by Wallace Revill as the Theatre Royal and Opera House on 4 August 1890.

Mercer Walker, p. 120
 1892 – Empire Palace, Edinburgh – Mercer Walker, p. 179

References

Sources

 
 
 
 
 
 

Lists of theatres